Martinsville is an unincorporated community and census-designated place (CDP) located within Bridgewater Township, in Somerset County, New Jersey, United States. As of the 2010 United States Census, the CDP's population was 11,980.

Martinsville is located in northeastern Bridgewater near Warren Township; the 08836 ZIP code also takes in the southern extension of Bernards Township. It is an affluent, predominantly residential area, though it does have its own commercial center along Washington Valley Road, and its own post office.

History
The Middlebrook encampment was a seasonal encampment of the Continental Army during the American Revolutionary War near Martinsville that straddled the ridge of the First Watchung Mountains. Its position provided a natural fortress not only protecting the Continental Army, but also overlooking the plains towards New Brunswick where the British forces were stationed in 1777.

Tradition holds that it was at the Middlebrook encampment that the first official flag of the United States was unfurled, after a law to adopt a national flag had been passed by Congress on June 14, 1777. By special order of Congress, a Thirteen Star Flag is flown 24 hours a day at the Washington Camp Ground, part of the former Middlebrook encampment, in Bridgewater. Since 1889, the first hoisting of the flag is commemorated annually each July 4 with a changing of the flag, a reading of the United States Declaration of Independence, and the delivery of an historical address.

Geography
According to the United States Census Bureau, Martinsville had a total area of 12.398 square miles (32.111 km2), including 12.322 square miles (31.914 km2) of land and 0.076 square miles (0.198 km2) of water (0.62%).

Demographics

Census 2010

Points of interest

Washington Valley Park, part of the Somerset County Park System, is located in Martinsville.  The park offers extensive hiking and mountain biking opportunities.  A notable hike in the park is an hour-long hike around the out-of-use reservoir that once served Bound Brook, New Jersey.
Devil's Tree is a solitary oak located in a field on Mountain Road. Legend has it that it is the property of the Devil and a gateway to Hell.
There is a Revolutionary War cemetery in the Spring Run section of Martinsville, where soldiers of both American and British troops are buried, along with some early settlers of the area.

Education
The Pingry School's upper division for grades 6 to 12 is located in Martinsville.

Little Friends of Jesus Nursery School (preschool, non-parochial) operate under the supervision of Roman Catholic Diocese of Metuchen.

Notable people

People who were born in, residents of, or otherwise closely associated with Martinsville include:
 Catherine Caro (born 1995), field hockey player.
 Andrea Kane, author of romance novels.
 Geraldine Laybourne (born 1947), founded Oxygen Media and has served as its chairman and chief executive officer since its inception.
 Upton Sinclair (1878-1968), author of The Jungle lived in Martinsville during the later years of his life.

References

Bridgewater Township, New Jersey
Census-designated places in Somerset County, New Jersey